Karadaga  is a village in the southern state of Karnataka, India. It is located in the Nipani taluk of Belgaum district in Karnataka. RIDASOFT SOLUTIONS

Demographics
 India census, Karadaga had a population of 8949 with 4606 males and 4343 females.

See also
 Belgaum
 Districts of Karnataka

References

External links
 http://Belgaum.nic.in/

Villages in Belagavi district